English indie pop trio London Grammar has released three studio albums, one extended play, 14 singles (including one as a featured artist) and 13 music videos. The band was formed in 2012 by Hannah Reid, Dan Rothman and Dominic "Dot" Major. After independently releasing their debut EP Metal & Dust in February 2013, London Grammar signed a contract with record label Ministry of Sound. 

London Grammar's debut studio album, If You Wait, was released in September 2013. It reached number two on the UK Albums Chart and was certified platinum by the British Phonographic Industry (BPI). Six singles, "Metal & Dust", "Wasting My Young Years", "Strong", "Nightcall", "Hey Now" and "Sights", were released from the album. "Strong" peaked at number four on the Australian Singles Chart and was certified double platinum, while "Wasting My Young Years" reached number two on the French Singles Chart. At this time, the group collaborated with electronic music duo Disclosure on the single "Help Me Lose My Mind", which reached number 56 on the UK Singles Chart.

Studio albums

Extended plays

Singles

As lead artist

As featured artist

Other charted songs

Other appearances

Music videos

Notes

References

External links
 
 

Discographies of British artists
Electronic music discographies
Pop music discographies